is a 2005 Japanese anthology drama film consisting of interwoven shorts about dogs. The film's various short stories are directed by Isshin Inudou, Hideki Kuroda, Yoshio Kuroda, Satoshi Nagai, Shinsuke Sato, Tetsuhisa Yazu and Atsushi Sanada.

The Marimo short section is particularly popular on Internet memes

There is a sequel to this film called Inu to Anata no Monogatari: Inu no Eiga.

Cast
 Shido Nakamura as Kentarō Yamada
 Yūki Amami as Miharu
 YosiYosi Arakawa as Koro's voice
 Noriko Eguchi
 Randy Goins as an Interviewer
 Misaki Ito as Misaki Shiratori
 Jiei Kabira as Masao
 Tae Kimura as Kaori's Mother
 Soichiro Kitamura as Yamamura
 Manami Konishi as Kaori
 Aoi Miyazaki as Mika
 Nozomi Ōhashi
 Otoha as Tomomi
 Shiro Sano
 Ryuta Sato as Katsuhiko
 Katsumi Takahashi
 Yoji Tanaka as Kentarō Maruyama
 Eriko Watanabe
 Hinano Yoshikawa

References

External links
  
 

2005 drama films
Japanese anthology films
Films about dogs
Films about pets
Films directed by Isshin Inudo
2000s Japanese films